United Nations Security Council resolution 512, adopted unanimously on 19 June 1982, after recalling resolutions 508 (1982), 509 (1982) and reaffirming the Geneva Conventions, the Council reminded all parties involved in the conflict in Lebanon to respect the rights of the civilian population by allowing the free distribution of aid from United Nations agencies and the International Committee of the Red Cross.

The resolution also called on Member States to provide assistance to the country, as well as reminding Member States of the humanitarian responsibilities of the relevant UN agencies. Finally, the Council requested the assistance of the Secretary-General with the situation, and to report back on developments regarding the implementation of the resolution.

See also
 1982 Lebanon War
 Blue Line
 Israeli–Lebanese conflict
 List of United Nations Security Council Resolutions 501 to 600 (1982–1987)

References
Text of the Resolution at undocs.org

External links
 

 0512
Israeli–Lebanese conflict
 0512
1982 in Israel
1982 in Lebanon
 0512
June 1982 events